The Masonic Temple is a historic building located at Fairmont, Marion County, West Virginia. It was designed by the Baltimore architectural firm Baldwin & Pennington, built in 1906–1907, and is a large, five-story, three bay mixed use commercial building with a mezzanine, a balcony, a partial sixth floor and a full basement. It measures 55 feet wide, 109 feet deep, and 90 feet high. The buildings has a steel and reinforced concrete structure and is faced in beige brick with extensive terra cotta detailing. The building was commissioned by Fairmont Lodge No. 9 (which no longer meets in the building), and is in the Beaux-Arts style.

It was listed on the National Register of Historic Places in 1993.

References

Former Masonic buildings in West Virginia
Clubhouses on the National Register of Historic Places in West Virginia
Beaux-Arts architecture in West Virginia
Masonic buildings completed in 1907
Buildings and structures in Marion County, West Virginia
Commercial buildings on the National Register of Historic Places in West Virginia
National Register of Historic Places in Marion County, West Virginia